Sick Kids may refer to:
 Royal Hospital for Sick Children, Edinburgh, Scotland
 Royal Hospital for Children, Glasgow, Scotland
 The Hospital for Sick Children, Toronto, Canada

See also
List of children's hospitals